Petra Klingler (born 14 February 1992) is a Swiss competition rock climber. Known as a versatile climber, she competes in bouldering and speed, lead, and ice climbing. It is historically rare for a climber to compete in so many different disciplines, especially ice climbing, although the combined format of the Tokyo Olympics has made it more common. Klingler was encouraged by her former coach to try ice climbing for fun, and as a way to build mental discipline.

Early life 
Klingler is a third-generation climber, and began climbing multipitch when she was six years old. She and her brother would spend weekends outdoors, while her parents and grandparents climbed, typically with three adults climbing and the other watching them. As a teenager she tired of climbing with her parents and began going to gyms and entering competitions. She was good at horse riding as a youth, but outgrew local competitions at 13 and began focusing on climbing instead. Klingler initially competed in lead climbing, but has since moved towards bouldering.

Climbing career 
Klingler was described as a late bloomer by climbing media after winning her first Bouldering World Cup at the age of 23 in 2015. That same year she came third in the lead climbing Ice Climbing World Championships and medaled in other events. Klingler went on to win Bouldering World Championships in 2016.

In 2016 she studied Sports Science and Psychology at the University of Bern, while also training, typically doing 10 sessions a week. Klingler described her main gym as not ideal for bouldering, but perfect for systematic training. She pulled back from training a bit in 2018 to finish her degree.

In 2017 she finished with a bronze medal in the Ice Climbing World Cup despite injuring her knee halfway up the final route. Klingler was in tears after stretching some ligaments and damaging her meniscus, but managed to continue up the route using only one leg.

In 2019 Klingler won the Swiss championships in all three Olympic disciplines: lead, speed and bouldering, and qualified for the 2020 Summer Olympics during the 2019 IFSC Climbing World Championships.

Rankings

Climbing World Cup

Ice climbing world cup

Climbing World Championships 

Adult

Ice climbing world championships

Medals in the Climbing World Cup

Bouldering

Ice climbing

References

External links 

1992 births
Living people
Female climbers
Swiss rock climbers
Sport climbers at the 2020 Summer Olympics
Olympic sport climbers of Switzerland
Ice climbers
21st-century Swiss women
IFSC Climbing World Championships medalists
Boulder climbers